Trelleborg AB is a global engineering group focused on polymer technology, with headquarters in Trelleborg, Sweden, with 21,230 employees and with yearly revenue of 33.8 billion SEK as of 2021. The company first went public in 1964 and currently trades on the Nasdaq Stockholm exchange as a large cap component. It has operations in 48 countries and describes its mission as the development of "engineered polymer solutions that seal, damp and protect critical applications in demanding environments".

History 

The company was founded in 1905 as "Trelleborgs Gummifabriks AB" (the Rubber Factory Corporation of Trelleborg) by Henry Dunker and Johan Kock, who were both already active in the rubber industry. Initially, the company had 150 employees and produced bicycle tires and rubber for industrial applications. During World War I, the Swedish Armed Forces placed substantial orders.

By the mid 1930s, the number of employees had reached 1,000. Beginning in the 1950s, the share of revenue from sales outside of Sweden increased; in 1950, it was 4%, and in 1970, it was 40%. In 1964, Trelleborgs Gummifabriks AB was floated at the Stockholm Stock Exchange. The current name was adopted in 1977. 

Between 1983 and 1991, the strategy was to act as a wide-ranging industrial conglomerate, with a particular focus on mining and metals. Later, the company's focus returned to rubber products. In 1999, the scope was further narrowed by specializing in industrial applications. In 2003, polymer-based precision seals were added to the product offerings. 

In 2009 the European Commission fined several marine hose producers, among them Trelleborg AB, "...for participating in a cartel for marine hoses between 1986 and 2007 in violation of the ban on cartels and restrictive business practices in the EC Treaty (Article 81) and the EEA Agreement (Article 53)." In mid 2012, Trelleborg and Freudenberg formed a 50–50 joint venture in antivibration applications for light and heavy vehicles, TrelleborgVibracoustic. 

In summer 2016, Trelleborg divested all of its shares to Freudenberg and that concluded the Automotive antivibration journey. In August 2022, it was announced Trelleborg had acquired the Lindau-based aerospace interiors company, MG Silikon GmbH, an entity within Saint-Gobain Group. In October 2022, Trelleborg acquired US-based company, Minnesota Rubber & Plastics, from private equity firm KKR & Co. for US$950million.

Operations 

Trelleborg AB is divided into the following business areas:

 Trelleborg Industrial Solutions (hose systems, industrial antivibration solutions and selected industrial sealing systems)
 Trelleborg Sealing Solutions (precision seals for industry, aviation and vehicles) – Founded in 1952, Trelleborg Sealing Solutions was previously a part of the Smiths Group's precision seals business. This business, Polymer Sealing Solutions, consisted of four rubber units. These were Busak+Shamban, Dowty Automotive, Shamban and Forsheda. In 2003, Polymer Sealing Solutions was acquired by Trelleborg AB. The name Busak+Shamban remained with all marketing locations, but the manufacturing locations became known as Trelleborg Sealing Solutions. As of April 2, 2007, the Busak+Shamban name was retired, with all locations being brought under the Trelleborg Sealing Solutions umbrella.
 Trelleborg Wheel Systems (tires and wheels for agriculture, forestry and materials handling vehicles)

Market 

Trelleborg AB was in 2018, according to Rubber & Plastics News, the third-largest player in the world market for non-tire rubber products.

The net sales for 2021 had the following geographical distribution:

Ownership 

The 10 largest shareholders of Trelleborg AB, as of December 31, 2018:

Governance 

Since April 26, 2018, Hans Biörck has been Chairman of Trelleborg AB. The following table lists the chairmen in chronological order since the company was founded.

Since October 1, 2005, Peter Nilsson has been president and CEO of Trelleborg AB. The following table lists the presidents and CEOs in chronological order since the company was founded.

References

Automotive companies of Sweden
Defence companies of Sweden
Manufacturing companies of Sweden
Engineering companies of Sweden
Chemical companies established in 1905
Companies listed on Nasdaq Stockholm
Multinational companies headquartered in Sweden
Tire manufacturers of Sweden
Swedish brands
Swedish companies established in 1905
Manufacturing companies established in 1905
Companies based in Skåne County
Companies based in the Øresund Region
Trelleborg